Kenneth Trevor Griffin (14 September 1940 – 7 March 2015) was an Australian politician. He was a Liberal member of the South Australian Legislative Council from 1978 to 2002, when he retired from politics. He led the Liberal Party in the Council from 1979 to 1982 and was deputy leader from 1982 to 2001. He also served as 44th Attorney-General of South Australia from 1979 to 1982 and from 1993 to 2001. After retiring from politics he became a wine maker.

Griffin died in Adelaide on 7 March 2015, and was buried privately.

References

1940 births
2015 deaths
Liberal Party of Australia members of the Parliament of South Australia
Members of the South Australian Legislative Council
Attorneys-General of South Australia
Australian winemakers
University of Adelaide alumni
Place of birth missing
21st-century Australian politicians